ISAR may refer to:

Intergovernmental Working Group of Experts on International Standards of Accounting and Reporting
International Search and Rescue Competition
Institute for the Study of Academic Racism
Inverse synthetic aperture radar, a technique to generate two-dimensional radar images of a target
Intelligible semi-automated reasoning, the formal proof language of the Isabelle proof assistant

See also
Isar, a German river
Isar, Province of Burgos, a municipality located in Castile and León, Spain
Isar Rural District, in Iran